Lancelot Ridley Phelps (b Sevenoaks 3 November 1853; d Oxford 16 December 1936) was  Provost of Oriel College, Oxford from 1914 to 1930.

Phelps was educated at Charterhouse and Oriel College, Oxford, where he matriculated in 1872, graduating B.A. in 1877. He was ordained as a deacon in the Church of England in 1879, but not as a priest until 1896. His career was spent as a Fellow and Tutor at Oriel. He was also an Alderman of Oxford and a member of the Royal Commission on the Poor Laws and Relief of Distress from 1905 to 1909.

References

Provosts of Oriel College, Oxford
1853 births
1936 deaths
People from Sevenoaks
People educated at Charterhouse School
Alumni of Oriel College, Oxford
Fellows of Oriel College, Oxford